Nouvelle Star (also known as À la Recherche de la Nouvelle Star for the first season) is a French television series based on the popular Pop Idol programme produced by FremantleMedia. It was broadcast by M6 in seasons 1–8 before D8 aired seasons 9-12. M6 broadcast the 13th and final season.

It was hosted by Benjamin Castaldi for the first three seasons (2003–2005). He also hosted 13 episodes of seasons 4 (2006). Virginie Efira presented the remainder of season 4, as well as presenting seasons 5 and 6. Virginie Guilhaume hosted seasons 7 and 8. Since season 9, Cyril Hanouna is the Nouvelle Stars TV host.

On 4 July 2012, Bibiane Godfroid, program director of Nouvelle Star announced that the show will not return on M6 but will instead be on D8, after its acquisition by Canal +.

In 2017, M6 confirmed that season 13 would be the last.

Format of the series
The four members of the jury have to judge about 25,000 contestants in various towns around France and Belgium. Until the final rounds begin, the show presents both the successful and the poorest performers, known as the "inoubliables" (unforgettable ones). Some of the worst performers have also performed as guests during the final stages.

Of the 25,000 contestants, only 150 (140 in season 6) are selected for the next round of auditions, which takes place at the Theatre Trianon in central Paris. There are two auditions over the space of three days, the highlights of which are shown over the course of two shows. Specific exercises are given to the contestants in order to evaluate their artistic talents: pitch, rhythmic accuracy, ability to remember lyrics and to learn songs, sing in a trio, and deal with tiredness and stress, etc. During the first day of the Theatre stage of auditions, contestants perform on stage in lines of eight, each contestant performing the song of their choice a capella. On day 2, 70 contestants who made it through the previous day are given a choice of three songs (two specifically for boys or for girls, and one for both, as of Series 6) and have to form trios with other contestants of their choice but of the same sex, they will be accompanied by a guitar and a piano. The 50 remaining contestants will interpret a song, in French, accompanied by an orchestra band. For the first time at this ultimate step before the live primes, this year, the contestants have performed in front of more than 400 persons including the jury at the theatre.

The jury will have to decide between 20 remaining contestants (27 in season 6) on a television screen, reviewing the all auditions of those contestants, of which they will select 15 for the first live television prime where they will be submitted to viewers' vote. In series 6, the viewers rejected 6 contestants of which the jury saved one.

There is no wildcard round in the French format, and viewers only vote by text or by phone. Only viewers' votes decide of the result during the prime, but the judges comment by giving first an illustrated verdict by colored traffic lights in front of them Blue for Good, and Red for bad performance (coloured lights introduced in season 5, and taken the form of traffic lights in season 6). The voting is different from American Idol as viewers vote during the programme and results are given at the end of it, by Virginie (The Host) and Maitre Najar(bailiff), where Virginie selects at random the saved contestants leaving only the ones dropped by the viewers. The previous seasons' jury (Mainly Marianne James) was used to contesting a lot the results.

Auditions

The inaugural season featured auditions in France, Belgium, and Quebec, Canada. Later series dropped Quebec from the audition tour, as Canadian Idol had started, and therefore, Francophones could audition in their home country.

For Nouvelle Star's seasons 2, 3 and 4, auditions were held in Toulouse, Rennes, Marseilles, Lyon, and Paris and in one location in Belgium, at Liège.

Overview

 Awards by season 

Spin-offs

Nouvelle Star, ça continue...Nouvelle Star, ça continue... is a program broadcast directly after the prime Nouvelle Star shows. It was broadcast on Fun TV (2003-2005), W9 (2006-2009), M6 (2010) and now on C8. The show includes interviews with judges, saved or eliminated contestants des jurés, invited musical guests. Hosts were Adrien Lemaître on Fun TV, Alexandre Devoise, Jérôme Anthony and Sidonie Bonnec all on W9, Estelle Denis and Jérôme Anthony on M6 with Camille Combal giving a diary, Énora Malagré on D8.

Saga Nouvelle StarSaga Nouvelle Star or La Saga Nouvelle Star''' was an old daily show hosted by Virginie Efira on M6, following various seasons of the Nouvelle Star show. It was broadcast only in 2007 and then stopped. In each show, she would present Top des Inoubliables internationaux (meaning best of international unforgettables), being winners from various countries where Idol series are broadcast. Broadcast at 19h00 in access prime time'', it brought in an average 1.1 million of viewers.

Summary

See also
 List of French Adaptations of Television Series from Other Countries

References

External links
 
 

 
2003 French television series debuts
French reality television series
French music television series
Television series by Fremantle (company)
French television series based on British television series
M6 (TV channel) original programming